Robert Turner Boyd (born February 11, 1948) is an American anthropologist. He is professor of the School of Human Evolution and Social Change (SHESC) at Arizona State University (ASU). His research interests include evolutionary psychology and in particular the evolutionary roots of culture. Together with his primatologist wife, Joan B. Silk (who is also a professor in SHESC at ASU), he wrote the textbook How Humans Evolved.

Life
Boyd was born in San Francisco. He studied physics at the University of California, San Diego (B.A., 1970). In 1975, he completed a Ph.D. in ecology at the University of California, Davis. From 1980 to 1984, he was assistant professor of the Department of Forestry and Environmental Science at Duke University. Afterwards, he taught two years in the Department of Anthropology at Emory University. From 1988 to 2012, Boyd was on the faculty of the University of California, Los Angeles Department of Anthropology. He is currently a professor at the School of Human Evolution and Social Change at Arizona State University.

Books 
 
  Also published by Fünfte Auflage in 2008.

External links 
 Faculty page at ASU
 

American anthropologists
University of California, Los Angeles faculty
1948 births
Living people
Cognitive science of religion
University of California, Davis alumni